Zoë S. Strother is an art historian. She serves as Riggio Professor of African Art at Columbia University. Her work focuses on 20th and 21st-century Central and West African art history.

She graduated from Yale University.

Strother was a 2000 Guggenheim Fellow. Her book Inventing Masks won the 2001 Arnold Rubin Outstanding Publication Award from the Arts Council of the African Studies Association. In it she describes masks as part of a larger performance and thus creative process. Against the Franz Boas vein of interpreting African art such as masks as a conservative matter of tradition, Strother’s fieldwork finds they are a site of invention and novelty, demonstrating the agency of the creators and wearers. Critics praised the book, saying the cover blurbs were “not hyperbole”.

Works
 Inventing Masks: Agency and History in the Art of the Central Pende (University of Chicago Press, 1998) , 
 Pende (5 Continents Editions, 2008) 
 Vladimir Markov and Russian Primitivism: A Charter for the Avant-Garde' with Jeremy Howard and Irēna Bužinska (Ashgate, 2015) , 
 Humor and Violence: Seeing Europeans in Central African Art, 1850-1997'' (Indiana University Press, 2016) ,

References

Living people
Columbia University people
Historians of African art
Women art historians
Year of birth missing (living people)